The New York State Chess Association (NYSCA) is the oldest continuously-run chess organization in the United States, having been formed in Auburn, New York in 1878, as the "Western New York and Northern Pennsylvania Chess Association."  The NYSCA name has been used since 1886.  It is the official New York State affiliate of the United States Chess Federation, and its history pre-dates the establishment of USCF. It organizes a variety of State-sanctioned championship tournaments across the Empire State, including the annual New York State Chess Championship, which has been held in Albany on Labor Day weekend since 2006.

While the State Championship and State Scholastic Championship has been held in every major city in the state, in recent years the State Championship and State Scholastic Championship has been most successful in the Albany-Saratoga region.  The State Scholastic, the oldest of its kind in the US, celebrated its 50th anniversary in Saratoga Springs in February–March 2017.

New York State champions have included Bobby Fischer, Joel Benjamin, José Capablanca, and Frank Marshall.  The current champion is IM Jason Liang who earned the title in 2021 and 2022.  The current Scholastic champion is Westchester County player Nicolas Checa.  The article "Hamilton 1941" by Bill Townsend, describing the games of a week-long championship held at Colgate University, won a Chess Journalists of America award for Best Historical Article.

NYSCA currently has about 750 members.  Its president is Bill Goichberg of Pelham in Westchester County.  Its vice-president is Westchester County chess teacher Polly Wright.  Its secretary is Phyllis Benjamin of Brooklyn, mother of New Jersey Grandmaster and former U.S. Chess Champion Joel Benjamin.  Its Treasurer is Karl Heck of Catskill, in Greene County.

Heck is also the editor of Empire Chess, the quarterly periodical of NYSCA.

Other major events sponsored by NYSCA include the New York State Open, which has been held in Lake George the past few years.  There is a highly successful Girls Championships, which have been held in New York City.

Membership in NYSCA is $20 for one year, and $57 for three years for four printed issues of Empire Chess

NYSCA also provides funding for its champions to attend the Denker Tournament of High School Champions, the Barber K-8 Cha.

References

External links
 New York State Chess Association Home Page

Chess organizations
Chess in the United States